Demostis is a genus of beetles in the family Buprestidae, containing the following species:

 Demostis elongata (Kerremans, 1900)
 Demostis louwerensi Obenberger, 1940

References

Buprestidae genera